The City of Altona was a local government area about  west of Melbourne, the state capital of Victoria, Australia.

History

The city was named after the town of Altona near Hamburg, Germany, in 1844 by Robert Wrede, a pastoralist and early settler. Land in the area was first incorporated as part of the Wyndham Road District on 6 October 1862, which became the Shire of Wyndham on 7 March 1864, and was renamed the Shire of Werribee on 15 December 1909.

On 20 February 1957, the Altona Riding of the Shire of Werribee was severed, and incorporated as the Shire of Altona, which was proclaimed by the Governor of Victoria on 29 May 1957, with nine councillors. It was declared a city on 21 December 1968. Only two changes occurred to Altona's boundaries; in 1958, a  reserve at Laverton was annexed to Werribee, while  in the east was severed and annexed to the City of Williamstown.

On 22 June 1994, the City of Altona was abolished, and along with the City of Williamstown and a couple of small neighbouring areas, was merged into the newly created City of Hobsons Bay.

Council met at the Altona Civic Centre, near the intersection of Civic Parade and Pier Street, Altona. The facility is still used for council meetings by the City of Hobsons Bay.

Wards

Altona was the only municipality in Metropolitan Melbourne never to be subdivided. The council consisted of nine councillors, who represented the entire area.

Suburbs
 Altona*
 Altona Meadows (shared with the City of Werribee)
 Altona North

* Council seat.

Population

* Estimate in the 1958 Victorian Year Book.
# As the Shire of Altona was created in 1957, this figure is an estimate only. Source: 1958 Victorian Year Book.

References

External links
 Victorian Places - Altona and Altona City

Altona
1957 establishments in Australia
1994 disestablishments in Australia
City of Hobsons Bay